A leadership election for Christian and Democratic Union – Czechoslovak People's Party (KDU-ČSL) was held on 8 November 2003. The incumbent leader Cyril Svoboda was unexpectedly defeated by Miroslav Kalousek.

Candidates
Cyril Svoboda - the incumbent leader of KDU-ČSL was endorsed by Czech Social Democratic Party leader Vladimír Špidla and was considered left-wing candidate. He was considered front-runner of the election.
Miroslav Kalousek - Kalousek was considered more right-wing candidate than Svoboda. He was endorsed by Civic Democratic Party leader Mirek Topolánek.
Jaromír Talíř - Considered the outsider of the election. 
Libor Ambrozek - Minister of environment. He had support in Moravian regions and offered himself as a centrist candidate.

Result

References

KDU-ČSL leadership elections
2003 elections in the Czech Republic
Indirect elections
Christian and Democratic Union - Czechoslovak People's Party leadership election